Gunnar Ibsen Sørensen (27 June 1913 – 10 May 2004) was a Danish rower. He competed in the men's coxed four at the 1936 Summer Olympics.

References

External links
 

1913 births
2004 deaths
Danish male rowers
Olympic rowers of Denmark
Rowers at the 1936 Summer Olympics
People from Thisted
Sportspeople from the North Jutland Region